The VFX Festival is an annual conference dedicated to computer graphics and visual effects, taking place in London, and hosted by Escape Studios, part of Pearson College London. The event was originally founded in 2012.

See also 
 ACM SIGGRAPH
 FMX (Conference)

References

External links 
 Official website

Computer graphics conferences
Recurring events established in 2012